Lewisburg High School is a public secondary school located in Olive Branch, Mississippi, United States. It opened in the fall of 2006, with there being no graduating class for the first two years. Its mascot is the Patriot, and its school colors are red and navy. It is operated by the DeSoto County School District.

History 

In 2006, Lewisburg High School opened under the direction of Principal James Brady. The school opened with few extra-curricular activities to offer. The first graduating class was in 2009, a few years later.
A population boom hit the area in 2012, with the number of enrolled students rising to 691 students. In 2013, Principal Brady retired and was replaced by the principal at the middle school, Chris Fleming.

Academics 

Lewisburg offers 12 Advanced Placement academic courses, as well as 6 Honors Courses. It also offers the National Honor Society, Mu Alpha Theta, a Beta Club, the Spanish National Honor Society, National English Honor Society, International Thespian Society, and German National Honor Society.

Athletics 

The sports Lewisburg has to offer are as follows:

 Archery (Co-ed)
 Baseball (Boys)
 Bowling (Co-ed)
 Basketball (Co-ed)
 Cheerleading (Co-ed)
 Cross Country Running (Co-ed)
 Dance (Girls)
 football (Boys)
 Golf (Co-ed)
 Powerlifting (Co-ed)
 Soccer (Co-ed)
 Softball (Girls)
 Swimming (Co-ed)
 Tennis (Co-ed)
 Track & Field (Co-ed)
 Volleyball (Girls)

Performing arts 

 The Lewisburg High School Choral Department has been in operation since 2008.
 The Lewisburg High School Drama Department has performed many productions, including Through The Storybook (2011), The Wizard of Oz (2013), Rodgers and Hammerstein's Cinderella (2014), and Beauty and the Beast (2016). It has been in operation since 2009.

Clubs and organizations 

 Art Club
 Band
 Beta Club
 Choir
 Diamond Girls
 Explorer's Club
 Fellowship of Christian Athletes
 Fellowship of Christian Students
 Interact Club
 International Thespian Society
 Knowledge Bowl
 Mu Alpha Theta
 National Honors Society
 SADD
 Science Club
 Senior Class
 Sign Language Club
 Spanish Club
 Speech/Debate Club
 Student Council
 Yearbook
 Youth Health Council

References

External links
 
 http://www.greatschools.org/mississippi/olive-branch/2703-Lewisburg-High-School/?tab=reviews

Schools in DeSoto County, Mississippi
Public high schools in Mississippi
2006 establishments in Mississippi